Benton County is the name of nine counties in the United States:

 Benton County, Arkansas 
 Benton County, Indiana 
 Benton County, Iowa 
 Benton County, Minnesota 
 Benton County, Mississippi 
 Benton County, Missouri 
 Benton County, Oregon 
 Benton County, Tennessee 
 Benton County, Washington
 Calhoun County, Alabama was established as Benton County in 1832, and renamed in 1858. 
 Hernando County, Florida was named Benton County from 1844 through 1850.